Hoseynabad l pain'khaf (also Romanized as Ḩoseynābād) is a village in Bostan Rural District, Sangan District, Khaf County, Razavi Khorasan Province, Iran. At the 2020census, its population wa3500, in 450 families.

References 

Populated places in Khaf County